The 2018–19 Northern Illinois Huskies men's basketball team represented Northern Illinois University during the 2018–19 NCAA Division I men's basketball season. The Huskies were led by eighth-year head coach Mark Montgomery, and played their home games at the Convocation Center in DeKalb, Illinois as members of the West Division of the Mid-American Conference. They finished the season 17–17 overall, 8–10 in MAC play to finish in fourth place in the West Division. As the No. 7 seed in the MAC tournament, they advanced to the semifinals, where they lost to Bowling Green.

Previous season
The Huskies finished the 2017–18 season 13–19, 6–12 in MAC play to finish in last place in the West Division. They lost in the first round of the MAC tournament to Kent State.

Offseason

Departures

Incoming Transfers

2018 recruiting class

2019 recruiting class

Roster

Schedule and results

|-
!colspan=9 style=| Non-conference regular season

|-
!colspan=9 style=| MAC regular season

|-
!colspan=9 style=| MAC tournament

Source

References

Northern Illinois
Northern Illinois Huskies men's basketball seasons
Northern
Northern